David Borofka is an America novelist and short story writer.  He is the author of the short story collection, Hints of His Mortality, which won the Iowa Short Fiction Award in 1996, and the novel, The Island (1997).

Borofka has won the Missouri Review’s Editors’ Prize, Carolina Quarterly’s Charles B. Wood Award for Distinguished Writing, the Emerging Writers Network Fiction Prize, Prism Review Fiction Award, and the Nancy D. Hargrove Award from Jabberwock Review.  His short fiction has also appeared in Image, Southern Review, Manoa, and Glimmer Train.  He was a professor of composition, literature and creative writing at Reedley College until his retirement in 2019.

A new collection of stories, A Longing for Impossible Things, was released by Johns Hopkins University Press in 2022, and a new novel, The End of Good Intentions, will be published in 2023 by Fomite Press.

References

External links

Living people
20th-century American novelists
20th-century American male writers
American male novelists
American male short story writers
20th-century American short story writers
Year of birth missing (living people)